Àlex Soler-Roig i Janer (born 29 October 1932) is a former racing driver from Barcelona, Spain. He participated in 10 Formula One World Championship Grands Prix, debuting on 19 April 1970, and scored no championship points. He also participated in several non-Championship Formula One races.

Biography
Son of Dr. Soler-Roig, Alex began his career with motorcycles before entering the world car racing, participating in rallies with Fiat and Porsche. His first victories came  in 1958 at the Nuvolari trophy in Barcelona and the Rally Catalunya. This allowed him some sponsorship to enter the Monte Carlo Rally. In 1968 raced the 24 Hours of Le Mans with team Porsche driving a 907/6 Langheck and a year later in the 24 Hours of Daytona, where he led his class until his co-driver Rudy Lins had an accident. In the same year he finished 4th in the 12 Hours of Sebring with a Porsche 907. That same year enters the F2 championship driving a Lola, and in 1969 placed seventh in Barcelona Grand Prix in a Lotus F2 from Roy Winckelman Team led by Bernie Ecclestone. Achieved victories in several races with Jochen Rindt on the 6 Hours of Jarama and second in the 1000 km of Buenos Aires.

His first race in Formula 1 was at the 1970 Spanish Grand Prix with a Lotus 49. Race organisers limited the race to 16 starters, resulting in Soler-Roig failing to qualify, despite lapping only a tenth of a second slower than Mario Andretti. However, on race morning there was a suggestion that the non-qualifiers might be allowed to start after all, so their cars were placed on the grid, only for the organisers to stick to their original decision, removing Soler-Roig's car from the grid as well as those of Jo Siffert and Andrea de Adamich. He subsequently participated at the Belgian Grand Prix, driving the Lotus 72 that was meant for Jochen Rindt. However, the car was not ready for Friday's practice and he only managed to complete three laps in Saturday's qualifying, and was therefore not allowed to start the race. His final Formula One outing for the season was another non-qualification at the French Grand Prix in a 49. He won the Spanish GT-Sport Championship that same year.

He started the 1971 season driving for the works March team, combining the Formula 1 Championship with the Spanish and German Touring Car Championships with Ford Capri. He won the Spanish Championship and finished fourth in Germany, but failed to finish any races in Formula 1.

Soler-Roig joined the Marlboro BRM F1 team for the 1972 season, but after a few races with problems in the car and the team, decided to spend the rest of the year racing the European Touring Car Championship with Ford, getting great results and victories in the 24 Hours of Spa, the 24 Hours of Paul Ricard, the 4 Hours of Zandvoort, 4 Hours of Jarama and the 3 Hours of Montjuich. His withdrawal from the world of competition occurred at the end of 1972, before his 41st birthday, to pursue his family business.

Racing record

Complete Formula One World Championship results
(key)

Complete Formula One non-Championship results
(key)

Complete British Saloon Car Championship results
(key) (Races in bold indicate pole position; races in italics indicate fastest lap.)

References

Profile at www.grandprix.com

1932 births
Living people
Spanish racing drivers
Spanish Formula One drivers
Catalan racing drivers
Catalan Formula One drivers
24 Hours of Le Mans drivers
24 Hours of Spa drivers
Team Lotus Formula One drivers
March Formula One drivers
BRM Formula One drivers
World Sportscar Championship drivers